Jules Halbert, born in 1886 in Landreau, was a French clergyman and bishop for the Roman Catholic Diocese of Port-Vila. He was appointed bishop in 1939. He died in 1955.

References 

1886 births
1955 deaths
French Roman Catholic bishops
Roman Catholic bishops of Port-Vila